Emmelina suspiciosus is a moth of the family Pterophoridae. It is found in Ecuador.

The wingspan is 24 mm. The forewings are brownish‑grey and the markings are dark brown. The hindwings and fringes are brownish‑grey. Adults are on wing in January and June.

References

Moths described in 1921
Oidaematophorini